Mária Gulácsy (27 April 1941 – 13 April 2015) was a Hungarian foil fencer. She won a silver medal in the women's team foil event at the 1968 Summer Olympics.

References

External links
 

1941 births
2015 deaths
Hungarian female foil fencers
Olympic fencers of Hungary
Fencers at the 1968 Summer Olympics
Olympic silver medalists for Hungary
Olympic medalists in fencing
People from Berehove
Medalists at the 1968 Summer Olympics
20th-century Hungarian women